Alavus is a town and municipality of Finland. Neighbouring municipalities are Alajärvi, Kuortane, Seinäjoki, Virrat and Ähtäri.

Agriculture and forestry employ a significant share of the population. Most of the industry in Alavus is related to construction: materials, design and contractors. The town is unilingually Finnish.

Geography

Villages
In 1967, Alavus had five legally recognized villages (henkikirjakylät):
 Alavus
 Rantatöysä
 Sapsalampi
 Sulkava
 Sydänmaa

Demographics 
In 2020, 16.7% of the population of Alavus was under the age of 15, 54.6% were aged 15 to 64, and 28.7% were over the age of 64. The average age was 46.1, above the national average of 43.4 and regional average of 44.7. Speakers of Finnish made up 98.3% of the population and speakers of Swedish made up 0.1%, while the share of speakers of foreign languages was 1.6%. Foreign nationals made up 1.2% of the total population.

The chart below, describing the development of the total population of Alavus from 1975 to 2020, encompasses the municipality's area as of 2021.

Urban areas 
In 2019, out of the total population of 6,919, 4,485 people lived in urban areas and 3,641 in sparsely populated areas, while the coordinates of 64 people were unknown. This made Alavus's degree of urbanization 60.7%. The urban population in the municipality was divided between three urban areas as follows:

Economy 
In 2018, 9.1% of the workforce of Alavus worked in primary production (agriculture, forestry and fishing), 24.0% in secondary production (e.g. manufacturing, construction and infrastructure), and 65.6% in services. In 2019, the unemployment rate was 8.5%, and the share of pensioners in the population was 33.0%.

The ten largest employers in Alavus in 2019 were as follows:

Notable people
 Erkki Huttunen (1901–1956), architect
 Rauha S. Virtanen (1931-2019), author

See also
Battle of Alavus
Niinimaa
Tuuri

References

External links
 
 Town of Alavus – Official website

 
Cities and towns in Finland
Populated places established in 1865